George Otis may refer to:

 George Demont Otis (1879–1962), American landscape painter
 George L. Otis (1829–1882), lawyer and politician in Minnesota